Lumea Nouă is a middle Neolithic to Chalcolithic (possibly Early Bronze Age) archaeological site in Alba Iulia, Romania. The site is named after the Lumea Nouă district of the city. The site was first researched (and likely discovered) by Ion Berciu in the 1940s. It has been excavated by several researchers since then, most recently Mihai Gligor of the 1 Decembrie 1918 University, Alba Iulia. Cultures present at this site include Vinča (B and C), Foieni, Petrești and Coțofeni.

See also
 Prehistory of Transylvania

Archaeology of Romania
Alba Iulia
Archaeological sites in Romania
Neolithic sites
Former populated places in Eastern Europe
Chalcolithic sites
Bronze Age sites